The 4T60-E (and similar 4T65-E) is a series of automatic transmissions from General Motors. Designed for transverse engine configurations, the series includes 4 forward gears. The 4Txx family is an evolution of the original Turbo-Hydramatic 125 transverse automatic introduced in the late 1970s.

The "-E" transmission is electronically controlled and features an automatic overdrive transaxle with an electronically controlled torque converter clutch.

The 4T65 is built at Warren Transmission in Warren, Michigan.

4T60-E

In 1991 GM introduced the 4T60-E which was a 4T60 with electronic controls. By the mid-1990s, the 4T60-E was the transmission of choice in nearly every front-wheel drive GM vehicle with the exception of compacts. A heavy-duty 4T60-E HD was produced in 1996 for the supercharged GM 3800 engine and reused in mid 2005 to 2009 with an LS4 5.3 liter V8 in four different models the Buick Lacrosse Super, Chevrolet Impala SS, Chevrolet Monte Carlo  SS, and Pontiac Grand Prix GXP. The 4T60-E was phased out in favor of the 4T65 beginning in 1997.

The 4T60-E featured a 245mm torque converter with varying stall speed and gear ratios.  For example, a '95 Beretta features a 1650 rpm stall converter as opposed to '99 Century converter with a stall of 2095 rpm. In the 4T60 family of transmissions, the combination of drive-chain sprocket ratios and the differential gear ratio together offer up to 12 different possible final drive ratios to allow the transmission family to cover various engine and vehicle applications.

Replacing a complete transaxle should only be done if a unit is verified to be the same as the unit it replaces, as in addition to the up to 12 variants of the final drive ratio, different applications and years can and will have incompatible electrical connectors. The use of an incorrect transaxle will result in undesired operation, up to and including total non-functioning of the transaxle.

Gear ratios:

Applications: 
 4T60-E
 1994-1999 Buick Century
 1992-1997 Buick LeSabre 3800 V6, L27
 1991-1996 Buick Park Avenue V6 3.8 L
 1991      Buick Reatta 3800 V6
 1993-1997 Buick Regal
 1991-1993 Buick Riviera 3800 V6
 1995-1996 Buick Riviera L67 & L36
 1994-1998 Buick Skylark
 1991-1993 Cadillac DeVille 4.9L V8
 1991-1992 Cadillac Fleetwood
 1991-1993 Cadillac Seville
 1991-1993 Cadillac Sixty Special
 1994–1996 Chevrolet Beretta/Corsica V6 3.1 L
 1992–1996 Chevrolet Lumina APV V6 3.4 L/3.8 L
 1993–2000 Chevrolet Lumina
 1995-1999 Chevrolet Monte Carlo
 1997-1998 Chevrolet Venture
 1994-1998 Oldsmobile Achieva
 1994-1996 Oldsmobile Cutlass Ciera/Oldsmobile Ciera V6 3100 L
 1993-1997 Oldsmobile Cutlass Supreme
 1992-1997 Oldsmobile 88
 1991-1996 Oldsmobile 98
 1992–1998 Oldsmobile Silhouette V6 3.4 L/3.8 L
 1991-1992 Oldsmobile Toronado/Trofeo 3800 V6
 1992-1997 Pontiac Bonneville
 1994-1998 Pontiac Grand Am V6 3.1 L
 1992-1996 Pontiac Grand Prix "GT" & GTP 3.4L V6 (LQ1 Motor)
 1992–1998 Pontiac Trans Sport V6 3.4 L/3.8 L
 4T60-E HD
 1991-1996 Buick Park Avenue
 1992-1996 Oldsmobile 88
 1992-1996 Oldsmobile 98
 1992-1996 Pontiac Bonneville
 1997 Pontiac Grand Prix "GT" 3800 V6 (L36 Motor)
 1995-1996 Buick Riviera

4T65-E
The 4T65-E was introduced to replace the 4T60-E in 1997. The 4T65-E included a larger 258 mm torque converter for some models and many other changes to improve reliability. It is able to handle vehicles up to 6500 lb (2948 kg) GVWR with up to 280 ft·lbf (380 N·m) of torque. A number of final drive ratios are available, with many distinct models.  Starting in mid year 2000 models, all 4T65-E models received an upgraded valve body.  Starting in 2003 the internal electronics were changed, hardened 4th gear shaft, ratcheting sprags for input and third gear were added. The last application was the 2011 Chevrolet Impala as GM has transitioned to the 6T70 family transmissions for 2012.

Models:
 M15 — 245 mm (9.6 in) torque converter
 MN3 — 258 mm (10.2 in) torque converter
 MN7 — 258 mm (10.2 in) torque converter and heavy-duty gearbox (see 4T65E-HD)
 MD7 — 245 mm (9.6 in) torque converter (Chinese version)
 M76 — 245 mm (9.6 in) torque converter (with all-wheel drive capability)

Gear ratios:

Applications:
 M15
 2000-2005 Buick Century V6 3.1 L
 1997–2003 Chevrolet Lumina/Monte Carlo V6 3.4 L/3.8 L
 1997–2003 Chevrolet Venture V6 3.4 L
 2000–2003 Chevrolet Impala V6 3.4 L/3.8 L
 1997–2001 Chevrolet Lumina/Monte Carlo V6 3.1 L
 1998-1999 Oldsmobile Intrigue V6 3.8 L
 1998-2003 Pontiac Grand Prix  V6 3.1 L/3.8 L
 1997-2004 Pontiac Grand Prix "GT" 3800 V6 (L36 Motor)
 2006-2007 Chevrolet Malibu (SS Models) V6 3.9 L
 3.29:1 M15
 Buick Rendezvous
 Buick Terraza
 Chevrolet Uplander
 Pontiac Montana SV6
 Pontiac Aztek
 Saturn Relay
 3.29:1 M76
 Buick Rendezvous
 Chevrolet Impala 9C1
 Oldsmobile Aurora V6
 Oldsmobile Intrigue Autobahn Package/PCS
 Oldsmobile Silhouette
 Pontiac Aztek
 2.86:1 or 3.05:1 M15
 Buick LeSabre
 Chevrolet Impala LA1
 Chevrolet Monte Carlo LA1
 Pontiac Bonneville FQ3
 3.05:1 MN3
 1997-2004 Buick Regal V6 3.8 L LS/LSE
 1997-2005 Buick Park Avenue V6 3.8 L
 1999-2002 Oldsmobile Intrigue V6 3.5 L
 2.92:1 M15
 Buick LaCrosse
 3.69:1 M76
Buick Terraza
 Buick Rendezvous
 Chevrolet Uplander
 Pontiac Aztek
 Pontiac Montana SV6
 Saturn Relay
 Volvo S80
 Volvo XC90

4T65E-HD
The 4T65E-HD (code MN7) is a heavy duty version of the 4T65-E used with more powerful engines such as the LS4 V8 and L67/L32 supercharged V6.

Applications:
 2.93:1 MN7
 Oldsmobile 88 LSS L67
 Pontiac Bonneville SSEi L67
 Chevrolet Impala L67
 Chevrolet Monte Carlo L67
 Pontiac Grand Prix GTP/GXP
 Buick Regal GS
 Buick Riviera L67 (97-99)
 Buick Park Avenue Ultra
 3.06:1 MN7
 Chevrolet Impala SS
 Chevrolet Monte Carlo SS (2006-2007)
 3.29:1 MN7
 Buick LaCrosse Super
 Pontiac Grand Prix GTP Comp G

References

See also
 List of GM transmissions

4T60-E